The 2008 UAW-Dodge 400 was the third stock car race of the 2008 NASCAR Sprint Cup Series. It was held on March 2, 2008, before a crowd of 153,000 in Las Vegas, Nevada, at Las Vegas Motor Speedway, an intermediate track that holds NASCAR races. The 267-lap race was won by Carl Edwards of the Roush Fenway Racing team, who started from second position. Hendrick Motorsports driver Dale Earnhardt Jr. finished second and Edwards's teammate Greg Biffle was third.

Kyle Busch, the pre-race Drivers' Championship leader over Ryan Newman, won the pole position with the fastest overall lap time in the qualifying session. Busch led the first twenty laps until he was passed by Edwards. He held the lead until the first green-flag pit stops and regained the position after the stops ended. Busch retook the lead on lap 81 and held it until he was passed by Matt Kenseth. Jeff Gordon took over the lead on lap 163, before Earnhardt became the leader on the 181st lap and maintained this position until Edwards regained it 14 laps later. The race was stopped for 17 minutes when Gordon crashed on lap 262, and car parts were strewn into the path of other drivers, requiring officials to clean the track. Edwards maintained the lead at the restart and held it to win the race. There were 11 cautions and 19 lead changes by nine different drivers during the race.

It was the second victory in succession that was achieved by Edwards over the course of the season, and the ninth of his career. He was later issued with a 100-point penalty after his car was found to violate NASCAR regulations, dropping him from first to seventh in the Drivers' Championship. Kyle Busch increased his lead over Ryan Newman to twenty points as a consequence. Ford took over the lead of the Manufacturers' Championship, five points ahead of Dodge. Chevrolet moved clear of Toyota in third place, with 33 races left in the season. The race attracted 12.1 million television viewers.

Background

The UAW-Dodge 400 was the third out of 36 scheduled stock car races of the 2008 NASCAR Sprint Cup Series. The standard track at Las Vegas Motor Speedway is a four-turn  oval. Its turns are banked at 20 degrees and both the front stretch (the location of the finish line) and the back stretch are banked at 9 degrees.

Before the race, Kyle Busch led the Drivers' Championship with 335 points, six points ahead of Ryan Newman in second and nineteen points over Tony Stewart in third. Kurt Busch and Carl Edwards were fourth and fifth, respectively, and Kasey Kahne, Kevin Harvick, Jimmie Johnson, Greg Biffle, Jeff Burton, Brian Vickers, and Martin Truex Jr. rounded out the top 12. In the Manufacturers' Championship, Dodge and Ford were tied for the lead with 12 points each; their rivals Chevrolet and Toyota were tied for third place with 10 points each. Johnson was the race's defending champion.

In preparation for the race, NASCAR held the second of its two preseason tests for Sprint Cup entrants on January 28–29 at Las Vegas Motor Speedway. Several incidents occurred during the second session; Regan Smith spun leaving turn two and damaged his car's nose after hitting the inside wall; Sam Hornish Jr. heavily damaged his car after scraping the wall hard; and Dario Franchitti heavily damaged his Dodge's rear after spinning. Jacques Villeneuve spun, but did not damage his car; David Ragan wrecked after spinning off turn two; and Mark Martin damaged the front of his vehicle when he hit a concrete piling after swerving to avoid a tow truck.

Edwards was looking forward to the race weekend, and felt his result would be good. Biffle was confident he could secure a top-five finishing position, and stated if his car's handling were good, he believed he could be in contention for winning the race. Having won twice at the track in the early 2000s, Kenseth said he enjoyed racing at Las Vegas Motor Speedway and hoped the Roush Fenway Racing cars would be able to contend for race victories. Johnson was considered by some bookmakers as the favorite to win the race, and in the event he succeeded, he would have become the first person to secure four consecutive victories in a NASCAR Cup Series racing event since Jeff Gordon won the Southern 500 four times between 1995 and 1998. He said it would be "great" if he took the victory, but would not approach the event differently from at a track where he had not won a race.

One change of driver happened before the race. Jon Wood, the grandson of retired driver Glen Wood, was originally scheduled to replace 1988 NASCAR Winston Cup Series champion Bill Elliott in the No. 21 Wood Brothers Racing car, but withdrew because of a lack of experience with the Car of Tomorrow, and former Haas CNC Racing driver Johnny Sauter took over his seat. Wood said he felt Sauter was a better qualifier when Elliott was not available to drive. Kahne developed a sinus infection two days before the event, and his team had Nationwide Series driver Jason Keller ready to replace him if he could not compete.

Practice and qualifier

Three practice sessions were held before the Sunday race, one on Friday and two on Saturday. The first session lasted 90 minutes, the second 45 minutes and the third 60 minutes. In the first practice session, Kyle Busch was fastest with a time of 30.009 seconds; Jeff Gordon, Johnson, Stewart, David Reutimann, Dale Earnhardt Jr., Edwards, Elliott Sadler, Kurt Busch, and Jeremy Mayfield rounded out the session's top-10 fastest drivers. Hornish made contact with the turn-two barrier, while Reed Sorenson and Patrick Carpentier spun in turn four, but avoided damaging their cars. Montoya switched to a back-up car after heavily colliding with the turn-two wall, and Bobby Labonte did the same after he lost control in turn four and damaged his left-rear quarter. Kahne made light contact with the turn-four wall, and the car was repaired by his team.

Forty-seven drivers entered qualifying on Friday afternoon. Due to NASCAR's qualifying procedure, 43 could race. Each driver ran two laps, with the starting order determined by the competitors' fastest times. Drivers who recorded their lap times early in the session were at an advantage because the track was cooler, and thus the air was more dense and the track gave more grip. Edwards felt his car had oversteer during his run. Kyle Busch won the third pole position of his career with a time of 29.613 seconds. He was joined on the grid's front row by Edwards, who was 0.125 seconds slower and had the pole position until Kyle Busch's lap. Martin qualified third, Gordon fourth, and Mike Skinner fifth. Biffle, Scott Riggs, Earnhardt, Kurt Busch, and Sadler completed the top-10 qualifiers. The four drivers who failed to qualify were A. J. Allmendinger, Joe Nemechek, John Andretti, and Sauter (who crashed at turn two on his first qualifying lap). Burney Lamar withdrew from the race prior to qualifying. After the qualifier, Busch said his team was aware of the car's potential, which was displayed in Friday's sole practice session and the January test session; he was worried about his vehicle being very tight going into the first and second turns, having been on the accelerator pedal throughout his fastest lap.

On Saturday afternoon, Matt Kenseth was fastest in the second practice session with a time of 30.321 seconds, ahead of Clint Bowyer, Earnhardt, Travis Kvapil, David Gilliland, Biffle, Johnson, Newman, Hornish, and Edwards. Kyle Busch scraped the outside wall while driving up the track; he sustained minor damage and did not switch to a back-up car. Later that day, Kahne led the final practice session with a time of 30.580 seconds; Edwards, Paul Menard, Gordon, his Hendrick Motorsports teammates Johnson and Earnhardt, Reutimann, Biffle, Bowyer, and Dave Blaney occupied positions two through 10. Bowyer moved to the outside of the track, but was unable to steer left and hit the outside wall leaving turn two and into the backstretch; he came down the track and Kyle Petty hit Bowyer and damaged his front-left fender before Bowyer's car stopped after he made contact with the inside wall. Bowyer was required to use a back-up car, but Petty was able to repair his chassis.

Qualifying results

Race
Live television coverage of the race began at 3:30 pm EST in the United States on Fox. Gusty winds from the north created strong headwinds on the back straight. Kenny Farmer, chaplain of Las Vegas Motor Speedway, began prerace ceremonies with an invocation. Actress Carol Linnea Johnson of the stage production Mamma Mia! performed the national anthem, and John Byers, co-director of UAW-Chrysler National Training Center, commanded the drivers to start their engines. During the pace laps, two drivers moved to the rear of the field because of unapproved changes: Bowyer had switched to a back-up car, and Kahne had changed his engine.

The race started at 4:48 pm; Kyle Busch maintained his pole position advantage heading into the first corner and led the field on the first lap. Carpentier went up the track on the same lap, but avoided hitting the barriers, while Reutimann did the same and scraped the outside wall, causing right-rear damage to his car. He was black-flagged by NASCAR because debris was dangling from his vehicle. Reutimann's right-rear tire exploded while entering the pit road on lap 5, but no debris was left on the track. On lap 9, Bowyer hit the wall, causing Kahne to drive down the track. He also made contact with Jamie McMurray, who slid through the infield frontstretch grass, causing the first caution flag and the appearance of the pace car. During the caution, most drivers elected to make pit stops for tires, and 18 drivers remained on the track.

Kyle Busch stayed out and led the field back up to speed on the lap 13 restart. Three laps later, Edwards started to challenge Kyle Busch for the lead. Jeff Gordon moved up to third on lap 18, and Martin moved from third to eighth by the same lap. Kyle Busch and Edwards ran alongside each other in the battle for the first position on lap 20; the battle concluded after Edwards passed Kyle Busch on the following lap. Gordon was passed by Biffle for third place on lap 22, while Kurt Busch moved up to fifth on the same lap. By lap 28, Biffle had closed the gap to Kyle Busch and passed him for second position two laps later. Edwards had a 1.3-second lead over teammate Biffle on the same lap. Kyle Busch fell to fourth place after Gordon passed him on the 33rd lap. Kyle Busch reclaimed the third position from Gordon two laps later; Kurt Busch had moved into third after moving ahead of Gordon on the same lap. By the 42nd lap, Edwards and teammate Biffle had opened a 3.0-second lead over Kyle Busch. Riggs and Kurt Busch both moved in front of Kyle Busch for third and fourth positions on lap 45.

Green-flag pit stops began on lap 48. Edwards and Biffle made pit stops on lap 49, handing the lead to Riggs. Hornish hit the turn-two outside wall on the following lap after his right-front tire went down in the trioval, and sustained damage to his right-front quarter panel, but no debris came off his car. After the pit stops, Edwards regained the lead and held a 5.0-second lead over Kyle Busch; Martin moved into third place, Riggs regained fourth place, and Harvick moved up to fifth place by lap 65. Four laps later, a second caution was needed when debris was spotted at turn two. Most of the leaders, including Edwards, made pit stops. Jeff Burton chose to remain on the track and led on the lap-76 restart, ahead of Earnhardt and Kyle Busch. On lap 78, Kyle Busch moved ahead of Earnhardt to take second place, and began to close the gap to Burton. Kyle Busch passed Burton to reclaim the lead three laps later, and opened up a 1.3-second advantage over Burton by the 92nd lap. Earnhardt was passed by Edwards for fifth place on lap 94, and Biffle got ahead of Gordon for seventh on the same lap. Edwards gained fourth place when he passed Stewart on the 96th lap, and Burton lost second to Kenseth two laps later. On lap 102, Burton fell to fourth place after Edwards passed him.

By lap 105, Kyle Busch held a 3.1-second lead over Kenseth. Four laps later, the third caution was triggered when Stewart's car made heavy contact with the turn-two wall after his right-front tire burst. Stewart grazed his foot and climbed out of his car; emergency workers helped take him to a waiting car, which took him to the infield medical center for further examination. All the leaders, including Edwards, chose to make pit stops for tires and adjustments under caution. NASCAR required Edwards to fall back to the end of the longest line because one of his crew members had allowed a tire to roll away from the pit box. Kyle Busch maintained the lead at the restart on lap 115; he was followed by Kenseth and Gordon. Kenseth passed Kyle Busch to take the lead on lap 116. On the next lap, Gordon passed Busch. By lap 135, Kenseth had opened up a 2.2-second lead over Gordon. Biffle moved in front of Burton for fourth place on the 139th lap. On lap 144, Robby Gordon's right-front tire blew, causing him to hit the turn-two wall, and the fourth caution was triggered. All the leaders made pit stops during the caution.

Kenseth remained the leader at the lap-150 restart; he was followed by Gordon. The fifth caution was deployed 12 laps later, when Carpentier was squeezed towards the backstretch outside wall by Newman, causing Carpentier to slide down the track and hit the inside wall. Ken Schrader was close by the incident, but swerved to avoid damaging his car. During the caution, the leading drivers, including Kenseth, elected to make pit stops for tires. Gordon took the lead and maintained it at the lap-166 restart. Biffle and his teammate Kenseth drove alongside each other in a battle for second place on lap 166, until Biffle escaped and ran onto the apron on the next lap. Mayfield burst his right-front tire on lap 171, but no debris came off his car, avoiding the need for a caution. Six laps later, Biffle passed Kyle Busch to take fifth place. Riggs experienced oversteer in the fourth turn while running down the inside of Labonte; Franchitti ran into Riggs, causing the sixth caution on lap 179. All the leaders, including Kenseth, elected to make pit stops for tires. Earnhardt led the field on the lap-184 restart; he was followed by Harvick and Edwards. Gordon moved into fifth place by lap 188. Harvick fell to fourth place when Edwards and Kenseth passed him.

Edwards passed Earnhardt to reclaim the lead on lap 195, while Earnhardt lost a further position after Kenseth got ahead of him on the same lap. Ten laps later, Biffle moved ahead of Harvick to take fifth place, while his teammate Kenseth had a 1.5-second lead over the second-place Edwards by the 211th lap. Three laps later, the seventh caution was issued when officials located debris in the turn-two groove. The leaders, including Edwards, chose to make pit stops for tires and car adjustments. One tire from Edwards's car went outside his pit box, but he was not penalized because a cameraman blocked Edwards's crew from retrieving the tire. Kenseth led the field back up to speed on the lap-220 restart; Earnhardt was in second place and Edwards third. Casey Mears hit Vickers, who spun and triggered the eighth caution on lap 224; both drivers avoided contacting the wall. Kenseth maintained the lead on the lap-228 restart. Edwards drove up the track in an attempt to take the lead on lap 229, but Kenseth kept the position. Four laps later, the ninth caution was needed when Dale Jarrett spun and hit the turn-two outside wall. Kenseth remained the leader at the restart on lap 237. Edwards passed teammate Kenseth for the lead two laps later, and began to pull away. Earnhardt caught up to Kenseth by lap 243, and 10 laps later, he passed Kenseth for second.

Kurt Busch's right-front tire exploded, causing him to hit the wall between turns three and four, and the 10th caution happened on lap 257. Kurt Busch retired from the race because of his crash. He was transported to the infield medical center for a mandatory check-up. Edwards remained in the lead for the lap-263 restart. Earnhardt spun his tires, forcing Kenseth onto the outside lane and Gordon to the inside, where he passed Earnhardt. Kenseth moved in front of Earnhardt and then made contact with Gordon, who was sent into the inside backstretch retaining wall, which had no SAFER barrier installed. Gordon's car's radiator flew out from its chassis and into the path of oncoming traffic. Kenseth slid, but was able to straighten his car and continue. The final caution was initially waved before a red flag was shown, stopping the race to allow officials to remove debris from the track. The race resumed 17 minutes later, with Edwards leading Earnhardt and Biffle. Edwards maintained the lead for the remaining two laps to secure his second consecutive win and the ninth of his career. Earnhardt finished second, ahead of Biffle in third, Harvick fourth, and Burton fifth. Ragan, Kahne, Kvapil, Hamlin, and Martin rounded out the top-10 finishers. The race had 11 cautions and 19 lead changes among 9 drivers. Edwards led four times for a total of 86 laps, more than any other competitor.

Postrace comments

Edwards appeared in Victory Lane in front of the crowd of 153,000 people to celebrate his second victory of the season, earning him $425,675. He was pleased with the result, saying it was "a very special win" and that he felt he was close to the form he had achieved in 2005: "I tried hard to stay calm. And I'm not the best at it sometimes. We all know that." He added, "We do this to win. Winning these races is the greatest. Winning a championship would be the ultimate. What we’re trying to do is win the championship this year. That's our number-one goal." Second-place finisher Earnhardt was disappointed, saying he had his car in his chosen position, but the red-flag period prevented him from winning the race: "Carl wasn't going to get beat today. He had it in the bag. He was so strong... I was terrible on cold tires. I wish all of you knew what that felt like. I hate it." Biffle was philosophical as he argued that he had the fastest car, but did not gain the track position he needed to challenge Edwards because he slid on pit road.

Despite his injury, Stewart said he hoped to participate in a planned two-day test session at Phoenix International Raceway. He also said he was worried about his crash because his legs and hips were tingling and his lower back was in pain. Stewart said the crash scared him and the tingling in his legs had improved after leaving the infield care center. Kurt Busch's crew chief Pat Tryson said  the Penske Racing South team and he were relieved the driver emerged uninjured after his crash on lap 256, and that they would do better at the next weekend's race. Gordon said his crash on lap 264 was "probably the hardest hit I've ever taken" and admitted fault for causing the crash. According to Kenseth, "I knew he was going to get a run on me, so I laid back a little bit... We came off [turn] 2 and I was up as high as I thought I could, and Jeff just came across. Whether it was on purpose or not, it just kind of wiped us out." Gordon said he hoped Speedway Motorsports chairman and chief executive Bruton Smith (the owner of Las Vegas Motor Speedway) would install SAFER barriers along the inside retaining walls around the track. Biffle said the circuit barriers should not have had gaps, and that all NASCAR tracks should have SAFER barriers installed.

After the race, NASCAR announced it had found a problem with the lid on the oil reservoir encasement during a postrace inspection on Edwards's car, which was later taken to the NASCAR Research and Development Center in Concord, North Carolina, for further analysis. Three days after the race, Roush Fenway Racing was given penalties for "actions detrimental to stock car racing", "car, car parts, components and/or equipment used do not conform to NASCAR rules", and a device or duct work that permitted air to pass through the car from one area of the interior of the car to another, or to the outside of the car. The penalties included a $100,000 fine and a six-race suspension for Edwards's crew chief Bob Osborne, who was suspended from NASCAR until April 30, 2008, and placed on probation until December 31, 2008. Roush Fenway Racing chief engineer Chris Andrews took over Osborne's role at the next race weekend. Edwards and car owner Jack Roush incurred the loss of 100 driver and owner points. If Edwards qualified for the Chase for the Sprint Cup, he would not receive 10 bonus points awarded to him for winning the race, which was used to determine the seeding order. Edwards was allowed to keep the victory; he moved from first to seventh in the Drivers' Championship. On March 12, Roush Fenway Racing announced it would not appeal the penalties.

Roush Fenway Racing president Geoff Smith said a bolt that held the oil lid together did not work because of vibration harmonics generated by Edwards's car and the Las Vegas race track. Edwards said the infraction was "an absolute mistake" and that his team had no intention of cheating. Edwards's teammate Biffle and Newman agreed the penalties were justified. According to Sadler, the penalties were not severe enough; he argued that the driver should be penalized or required to miss one event. Roush felt White's comments were motivated by results. White later issued a statement in which he apologized for his comments. An internal investigation found no evidence another person had intentionally caused the bolt to come loose, and that the team enacted protective measures to ensure the oil lid would stay fastened in future events.

The result meant Kyle Busch maintained his lead in the Drivers' Championship, 20 points ahead of Newman in second place. Kahne's seventh-place finish allowed him to advance into third place, 16 points in front of Harvick, who also moved up three positions. Biffle was in fifth at 427 points. Burton, Edwards, Truex, Sadler, Earnhardt, Stewart, and Kurt Busch rounded out the top 12. Ford moved into the lead of the Manufacturers' Championship, five points ahead of Dodge. Chevrolet moved three points clear of Toyota. The event had a television audience of 12.1 million viewers; it took 3:08:08 to complete the race, and the margin of victory was 0.504 seconds.

Race results

Standings after the race

 Note: Only the top-12 positions are included for the driver standings.

References

External links

UAW-Dodge 400
UAW-Dodge 400
NASCAR races at Las Vegas Motor Speedway
UAW-Dodge 400